Yogeshbhai Narayandas Patel (born 23 July 1946) is an Indian politician. He has been a Member of the Gujarat Legislative Assembly from the Manjalpur Assembly constituency since 2012. He is associated with the Bharatiya Janata Party. On 15 December 2022, he became Pro-Term Speaker.

References 

1946 births
Members of the Gujarat Legislative Assembly
Bharatiya Janata Party politicians
Living people